Colombia competed at the 1968 Summer Olympics in Mexico City, Mexico. 43 competitors, 38 men and 5 women, took part in 33 events in 5 sports. They did not win any medals.

Athletics

Men's 100 metres
 Jimmy Sierra
 Round 1 — 10.8 s (→ 7th in heat, did not advance)

Men's 200 metres
 Pedro Grajales
 Round 1 — 21.0 s (→ 4th in heat, did not advance)

Men's 400 metres
 Pedro Grajales
 Round 1 — 46.7 s (→ 2nd in heat, advanced to round 2)
 Round 2 — 46.5 s (→ 8th in heat, did not advance)

Men's 10,000 metres
 Álvaro Mejía — 30:10.6 min (→ 10th place)

Men's 10,000 metres
 Hernán Barreneche — DNS (→ no ranking)

Men's 110 metres hurdles
 Hernando Arrechea
 Round 1 — 14.0 s (→ 5th in heat, did not advance)

Cycling

Ten cyclists represented Colombia in 1968.

1000m time trial
 Jorge Hernández — 1:09.24 min (→ 25th place)

Sprint
 Jaime Galeano
 Round 1 — 2nd in heat (→ advanced to repechage)
 Repechage — 3rd in heat (→ did not advance)
 Héctor Urrego
 Round 1 — 2nd in heat (→ advanced to repechage)
 Repechage — 3rd in heat (→ did not advance)

Individual pursuit
 Martín Rodríguez
 Qualification — 4:45.38 min (→ 9th in trial, did not advance)

Team pursuit
 Luis Saldarriaga, Mario Vanegas, Severo Hernández, Martín Rodríguez
 Qualification — 4:31.98 min (→ did not advance)

Individual road race
 Martín Rodríguez — 4:43:58.49 hrs (→ 9th place)
 Álvaro Pachón — 4:44:13.10 hrs (→ 15th place)
 Pedro Sánchez — 4:46:37.94 hrs (→ 30th place)
 Miguel Samaca — DNF (→ no ranking)

Diving

Men's 3 metre springboard
 Roque Barjum (→ 24th place)

Women's 3 metre springboard
 Martha Manzano (→ 22nd place)

Men's 10 metre platform
 Diego Henao (→ 32nd place)

Football

Men's team competition
Preliminary round (Group A)
 Colombia – Mexico 0-1
 Colombia – Guinea 2-3
 Colombia – France 2-1
 → 3rd in group, did not advance
Team roster
 ( 1.) Otoniel Quintana
 ( 2.) Gabriel Hernández
 ( 3.) Luis Soto
 ( 4.) Oscar Muñoz
 ( 5.) Darío López
 ( 6.) Joaquín Pardo
 ( 7.) Pedro Ospina
 ( 8.) Germán Gonzalez
 ( 9.) Alfredo Arango
 (10.) Norman Ortiz
 (11.) Gustavo Santa
 (12.) Ramiro Viafara
 (13.) Alberto Escobar
 (14.) Gabriel Berdugo
 (15.) Javier Tamayo
 (16.) Alfonso Jaramillo
 (17.) Fabio Mosquera

Swimming

Men's 100 metres freestyle
 Federico Sicard
 Heats — 59.0 s (→ 6th in heat, did not advance)
 Ricardo González
 Heats — 57.0 s (→ 6th in heat, did not advance)

Women's 100 metres freestyle
 Patricia Olano
 Heats — 1:05.3 min (→ 6th in heat, did not advance)

Men's 200 metres freestyle
 Federico Sicard
 Heats — 2:11.1 min (→ 5th in heat, did not advance)
 Ricardo González
 Heats — 2:05.8 min (→ 5th in heat, did not advance)
 Julio Arango
 Heats — 2:03.1 min (→ 2nd in heat, did not advance)

Women's 200 metres freestyle
 Patricia Olano
 Heats — 2:25.1 min (→ 5th in heat, did not advance)

Men's 400 metres freestyle
 Julio Arango
 Heats — 4:25.8 min (→ 4th in heat, did not advance)

Women's 400 metres freestyle
 Patricia Olano
 Heats — 5:01.8 min (→ 5th in heat, did not advance)
 Olga De Angulo
 Heats — 5:08.6 min (→ 3rd in heat, did not advance)

Women's 800 metres freestyle
 Patricia Olano
 Heats — 10:44.1 min (→ 4th in heat, did not advance)
 Olga De Angulo
 Heats — 10:40.5 min (→ 5th in heat, did not advance)

Men's 1500 metres freestyle
 Julio Arango
 Heats — 11:53.1 min (→ 4th in heat, did not advance)
 Tomás Becerra
 Heats — DNS (→ no ranking)

Men's 100 metres breaststroke
 Ivan Gonima
 Heats — 1:15.1 min (→ 7th in heat, did not advance)

Men's 200 metres breaststroke
 Ivan Gonima
 Heats — 2:45.0 min (→ 6th in heat, did not advance)

Men's 100 metres butterfly
 Tomás Becerra
 Heats — 1:02.2 min (→ 6th in heat, did not advance)

Women's 100 metres butterfly
 Carmen Gómez
 Heats — 1:14.7 min (→ 4th in heat, did not advance)

Men's 200 metres butterfly
 Tomás Becerra
 Heats — 2:16.8 min (→ 4th in heat, did not advance)

Women's 200 metres butterfly
 Carmen Gómez
 Heats — 2:44.7 min (→ 5th in heat, did not advance)

Women's 200 metres individual medley
 Nelly Syro
 Heats — 2:55.7 min (→ 5th in heat, did not advance)
 Olga De Angulo
 Heats — 2:48.7 min (→ 7th in heat, did not advance)

Men's 400 metres individual medley
 Tomás Becerra
 Heats — 5:09.7 min (→ 5th in heat, did not advance)

Women's 400 metres individual medley
 Olga De Angulo
 Heats — 6:00.6 min (→ 5th in heat, did not advance)
 Patricia Olano
 Heats — 5:52.6 min (→ 5th in heat, did not advance)
 Nelly Syro
 Heats — 6:13.1 min (→ 5th in heat, did not advance)

Men's 4x100 metres freestyle relay
 Julio Arango, Federico Sicard, Tomás Becerra, Ricardo González
 Heats — 3:51.5 min (→ 7th in heat, did not advance)

Men's 4x200 metres freestyle relay
 Tomás Becerra, Federico Sicard, Ricardo González, Julio Arango
 Heats — 8:26.7 min (→ 5th in heat, did not advance)

See also
Sports in Colombia

References

External links
Official Olympic Reports
Part Three: Results

Nations at the 1968 Summer Olympics
1968
Oly